Ashburn Presbyterian Church is a historic Presbyterian church located in Ashburn, Loudoun County, Virginia. It was built in 1878, and is a one-story, rectangular wood-frame building in the Carpenter Gothic style.  The church measures 33 feet wide by 50 feet long, and is topped by a steep gable roof.

It was listed on the National Register of Historic Places in 1999.

References

External links
Ashburn Presbyterian Church website

Presbyterian churches in Virginia
Churches on the National Register of Historic Places in Virginia
Carpenter Gothic church buildings in Virginia
Churches completed in 1878
National Register of Historic Places in Loudoun County, Virginia
Churches in Loudoun County, Virginia